Pulaski is a village in Pulaski County, Illinois, United States. The population was 235 at the 2010 census. The village is named in honor of Polish Revolutionary War hero Casimir Pulaski.

History

Pulaski was founded in 1852 as a construction camp along the Illinois Central Railroad. A post office was established in 1856.  The village was initially known as "Camp Pulaski," but the "Camp" was dropped from the name in 1872. Pulaski incorporated in 1898.

Geography
Pulaski is located at  (37.216751, -89.206127).  The village lies in the Cache River basin north of Cairo.  It straddles Old U.S. Highway 51 and is west of Interstate 57. Pulaski is west of the Ohio River.

Demographics

As of the census of 2000, there were 274 people, 116 households, and 67 families residing in the village. The racial makeup of the village was 28.10% White, 70.80% African American, and 1.09% from two or more races.

There were 116 households, out of which 25.9% had children under the age of 18 living with them, 32.8% were married couples living together, 21.6% had a female householder with no husband present, and 41.4% were non-families. 37.1% of all households were made up of individuals, and 21.6% had someone living alone who was 65 years of age or older. The average household size was 2.36 and the average family size was 3.22.

In the village, the population was spread out, with 29.2% under the age of 18, 7.7% from 18 to 24, 22.6% from 25 to 44, 19.0% from 45 to 64, and 21.5% who were 65 years of age or older. The median age was 38 years. For every 100 females, there were 82.7 males. For every 100 females age 18 and over, there were 67.2 males.

The median income for a household in the village was $16,786, and the median income for a family was $28,250. Males had a median income of $29,444 versus $18,333 for females. The per capita income for the village was $12,946. About 26.5% of families and 32.9% of the population were below the poverty line, including 42.9% of those under the age of eighteen and 29.8% of those 65 or over.

References

External links

Villages in Pulaski County, Illinois
Villages in Illinois
Polish-American culture in Illinois